In early-1970s, the CBS television network aired American Basketball Association (ABA) games, specifically league's annual All-Star Game/selected playoff games. Pat Summerall served as the CBS analyst on some ABA games alongside Don Criqui on play-by-play. Game 5 of the 1970 ABA Finals (Indiana vs. Los Angeles) was nationally televised by CBS on Saturday, May 23 at 3 p.m Eastern Time. The broadcast was however, blacked out in Indiana. After that league's 1972-73 season, CBS lost its TV airing rights as they started airing National Basketball Association (NBA) games in its 1973-74 season onward.

Had there been a seventh game of the 1975-76 season's championship playoff series it would've been televised by NBC, because that network signed contract to a potential seventh game on Sunday, May 16, 1976. Since the ABA Finals ultimately ended in six games, with the New York Nets triumphing over the Denver Nuggets in what would become the ABA's final game of its nine year existence, NBC's contract was void.

1960s

1967–68

1968–69

1969–70

During the Brooklyn Nets' ABA years, announcers included Marty Glickman, Marv Albert's brothers Al Albert and Steve Albert, baseball Hall of Fame pitcher Bob Gibson, Bob Goldsholl, as well as John Sterling and Mike DiTomasso. The latter two joined the club's move into the NBA.

1970s

1970-71

1971–72

1972–73

1974–75

1975-76

 
During the mid-1970s, HBO aired several basketball games from the National Basketball Association and the American Basketball Association (notably, the last ABA Finals game in 1976, prior to the latter league's merger with the NBA, between the New York Nets and the Denver Nuggets).

In 1976, CBS sought to establish a postseason playoff between the ABA and NBA, and to win the rights to broadcast those games.

During the 1976–77 season, the NBA's first after the ABA–NBA merger brought the American Basketball Association into the league, CBS held a slam dunk contest that ran during halftime of the Game of the Week telecasts. Don Criqui was the host of this particular competition. The final, which pitted Larry McNeill of the Golden State Warriors against eventual winner Darnell "Dr. Dunk" Hillman of the Indiana Pacers, took place during Game 6 of the 1977 NBA Finals. At the time of the final, Hillman's rights had been traded to the New York Nets, but he had not yet signed a contract. Since he was not officially a member of any NBA team, instead of wearing a jersey, he competed in a plain white tank top. Then for the post-competition interview, Hillman donned a shirt with the words "Bottle Shoppe" – the name of an Indianapolis liquor store, which is still in existence, and was the sponsor of a city parks softball league team for which Hillman played left field (and the only team he was a member of at the time). Other players to compete in the slam dunk tournament included Julius Erving, George Gervin, Kareem Abdul-Jabbar and Moses Malone. CBS, anxious for star power, also gave David Thompson the opportunity to be eliminated three times.

See also
List of historical NBA over-the-air television broadcasters
List of Brooklyn Nets broadcasters
List of Indiana Pacers broadcasters

References

External links
NBA TEAMS OVER THE AIR STATIONS
THE NBA ON NETWORK TELEVISION - CiteSeerX
BAA/NBA/ABA LOCAL OVER-THE-AIR TELEVISION BROADCASTS 
Remember the ABA
Television/Radio Age - American Radio History

 
American Basketball Association
 
CBS Sports
HBO Sports
Indiana Pacers announcers
San Antonio Spurs announcers
New York Nets announcers
Denver Nuggets announcers